Quindío River is the principal river of the department of Quindío, Colombia.  It combines with the Barragán River at the Valle de Maravelez to form La Vieja River, in turn a tributary of the Cauca River.

It forms in the mountains east of Salento and flows in a south-westerly direction, passing by the township of Salento and forming the eastern limit of the city of Armenia. Its major tributaries are the Verde River and the Navarco River (these in turn have the tributaries Santo Domingo and Boquerón, respectively).

The river is the source of drinking water for the majority of the inhabitants of the department.  The continued increase in demand is placing significant pressure on this resource.  Additionally, there are contamination problems due to inadequate waste water treatment facilities in the municipalities along the river.

References 

 Corporación Autónoma Regional del Quindío (2005), Proyecto Ordenacion y Manejo de la Cuenca del Río La Vieja 

Rivers of Colombia